William L. Wainwright (October 19, 1947 – July 17, 2012) was a  Democratic member of the North Carolina General Assembly representing the state's twelfth House district, including constituents in Craven and Lenoir counties. A church elder from Havelock, North Carolina, Wainwright was serving in his eleventh term in the state House of Representatives when he died in office after a prolonged illness.

Biography

William Wainwright was born in Somerville, Tennessee and graduated with a BS degree from Memphis State University in 1970. He was pastor of Piney Grove AME Zion Church from 1985 to 1993.

In January 2007, Wainwright was nominated by his colleagues in the Democratic caucus as Speaker pro tempore of the House. He was elected on January 24, making him the first African American to serve in the number-two post in the House since Reconstruction. He was re-elected Speaker pro tempore in 2009. After Democrats lost their House majority, Wainwright was elected deputy minority leader.

Footnotes

External links
NCGA Official Page
Project Vote Smart bio page

|-

|-

|-

Democratic Party members of the North Carolina House of Representatives
1947 births
2012 deaths
Politicians from New Bern, North Carolina
21st-century American politicians
People from Somerville, Tennessee
People from Havelock, North Carolina